Melawa Devi Gurung was a Nepali singer who is best known for being the first female singer from Nepal. In 1928, Devi recorded songs in Calcutta, British India and became known after recording "Na Gharlai Ghar Kahincha Nari Nai Durbar Ho". She also used to sing songs for Chandra Shumsher Jang Bahadur Rana, Prime Minister of Nepal.

References

Citations

Bibliography 

 
 
 
 

People from Okhaldhunga District
20th-century Nepalese women singers